Route 304 is a collector road in the Canadian province of Nova Scotia.

It is located in Yarmouth County and connects Yarmouth at Trunk 1 with Cape Forchu.

Communities
Yarmouth
Milton
Milton Highlands
Overton
Yarmouth Bar
Cape Forchu

See also
List of Nova Scotia provincial highways

References

304
304
Yarmouth, Nova Scotia